= 1967 Dow Chemical protest =

Student protest in Wisconsin, United States

The Dow Chemical protest in 1967, was an incident at the University of Wisconsin-Madison, where student protesters blocked people from accessing job interviews with Dow Chemical Company, who were recruiting on campus. The protesters were frustrated with Dow Chemical, because they were manufacturers of the napalm used by American forces in the Vietnam War. The student protesters were forcibly removed by police, and the incident became the first Vietnam War related protest at a university to end in police violence. The incident only inspired further anti-war protests at the University of Wisconsin, which continued for years to come.

== Events ==
In February 1967, student protestors held a sit-in, as an attempt to protest Dow Chemical's connections to the U.S. military.

The second round of anti-Dow protests began on October 17, 1967. After Dow recruiters arrived on campus in the early morning, around 200 student protestors gather in the Commerce Building to disrupt and block the recruiter's interviews. By mid-day the students became disorderly and pushed an interviewee, causing a police intervention. Around 200 more students arrived, and the police called for more officers. Police inform the protestors the assembly is unlawful, but only more students join the crowd. The police attempted to negotiate with the protestors but these talks failed. According to ROTC cadet Bob Lawrence, who was there at the time, "...protesters started chanting “Sieg Heil” and giving the Nazi salute to police officers. Many of the officers were World War II veterans. That was just not something you did. My dad was a World War II veteran, and I thought the protesters were crazy to do that. It caused the police to riot." There are differing accounts as to how the melee started, but eventually police and protestors began to battle. By the afternoon, an overwhelming police presence dispersed the crowd.

== Legacy ==
Many in the university faculty were shocked by the battle and voted for a resolution to ban calls for police to intervene in campus protests. Three days after the melee, students marched on the state capitol to protest the Vietnam War, Dow Chemical on campus, and police violence.

The university chancellor posted bail for all those arrested at the protest. The Wisconsin state assembly eventually passed an ordinance demanding that all protestors be expelled.

The Dow Chemical protest is remembered by many alumni who witnessed it, as the moment that accelerated student protests at the University of Wisconsin. Many previous apathetic students, claimed to have become much more politically engaged after the protest.

After the Dow protest, protests at the University of Wisconsin campuses became more violent, with protesters often carrying clubs and smashing nearby windows.
